Halid Lwaliwa (born 22 August 1996) is a Ugandan footballer who plays as a centre-back for FK Bregalnica Štip and the Uganda  national football team.

Club career
Born in Iganga, Lwaliwa attended St. Mary's Boarding Secondary School in Kitende before starting his footballing career at Vipers SC where he was promoted to the senior side in 2014. He signed a contract extension in August 2018. In 2022, Halid joined FK Bregalnica Strip in North Macedonia.

International career
He made his international debut on 21 September 2019 in a 3–0 win over Burundi at the 2020 African Nations Championship qualification.

References

External links
 
 

1996 births
Living people
Ugandan footballers
Uganda international footballers
People from Iganga District
Association football central defenders
Vipers SC players
Uganda Premier League players
Uganda A' international footballers
2020 African Nations Championship players